Combinatory logic is a notation to eliminate the need for quantified variables in mathematical logic. It was introduced by Moses Schönfinkel and Haskell Curry, and has more recently been used in computer science as a theoretical model of computation and also as a basis for the design of functional programming languages. It is based on combinators, which were introduced by Schönfinkel in 1920 with the idea of providing an analogous way to build up functions—and to remove any mention of variables—particularly in predicate logic.  A combinator is a higher-order function that uses only function application and earlier defined combinators to define a result from its arguments.

In mathematics
Combinatory logic was originally intended as a 'pre-logic' that would clarify the role of quantified variables in logic, essentially by eliminating them. Another way of eliminating quantified variables is Quine's predicate functor logic. While the expressive power of combinatory logic typically exceeds that of first-order logic, the expressive power of predicate functor logic is identical to that of first order logic (Quine 1960, 1966, 1976).

The original inventor of combinatory logic, Moses Schönfinkel, published nothing on combinatory logic after his original 1924 paper. Haskell Curry rediscovered the combinators while working as an instructor at Princeton University in late 1927. In the late 1930s, Alonzo Church and his students at Princeton invented a rival formalism for functional abstraction, the lambda calculus, which proved more popular than combinatory logic. The upshot of these historical contingencies was that until theoretical computer science began taking an interest in combinatory logic in the 1960s and 1970s, nearly all work on the subject was by Haskell Curry and his students, or by Robert Feys in Belgium. Curry and Feys (1958), and Curry et al. (1972) survey the early history of combinatory logic. For a more modern treatment of combinatory logic and the lambda calculus together, see the book by Barendregt, which reviews the models Dana Scott devised for combinatory logic in the 1960s and 1970s.

In computing
In computer science, combinatory logic is used as a simplified model of computation, used in computability theory and proof theory. Despite its simplicity, combinatory logic captures many essential features of computation.

Combinatory logic can be viewed as a variant of the lambda calculus, in which lambda expressions (representing functional abstraction) are replaced by a limited set of combinators, primitive functions without free variables. It is easy to transform lambda expressions into combinator expressions, and combinator reduction is much simpler than lambda reduction. Hence combinatory logic has been used to model some non-strict functional programming languages and hardware. The purest form of this view is the programming language Unlambda, whose sole primitives are the S and K combinators augmented with character input/output. Although not a practical programming language, Unlambda is of some theoretical interest.

Combinatory logic can be given a variety of interpretations. Many early papers by Curry showed how to translate axiom sets for conventional logic into combinatory logic equations (Hindley and Meredith 1990). Dana Scott in the 1960s and 1970s showed how to marry model theory and combinatory logic.

Summary of lambda calculus 

Lambda calculus is concerned with objects called lambda-terms, which can be represented by
the following three forms of strings:

       
       
       

where  is a variable name drawn from a predefined infinite set of

Terms of the form  are called abstractions. The variable v is
of the abstraction.  The term  represents the function which, applied
to an argument, binds the formal parameter v to the argument and then
computes the resulting value of — that is, it returns , with
every occurrence of v replaced by the argument.

Terms of the form  are called applications. Applications model
If 
(sometimes called the applicand) is an abstraction, the term may be
reduced: , the argument, may be substituted into the body of 
term which is equivalent to the old one. If a lambda term contains no
subterms of the form  then it cannot be reduced, and is said to
be in normal form.

Thus we write

The motivation for this definition of reduction is that it captures
the essential behavior of all mathematical functions. For example,
consider the function that computes the square of a number. We might
write

The square of x is 

(Using "" to indicate multiplication.)  x here is the formal parameter of the function. To evaluate the square for a particular
argument, say 3, we insert it into the definition in place of the
formal parameter:

The square of 3 is 

To evaluate the resulting expression , we would have to resort to
our knowledge of multiplication and the number 3. Since any
computation is simply a composition of the evaluation of suitable
functions on suitable primitive arguments, this simple substitution
principle suffices to capture the essential mechanism of computation.
Moreover, in lambda calculus, notions such as '3' and '' can be
represented without any need for externally defined primitive
operators or constants. It is possible to identify terms in lambda calculus, which, when suitably interpreted, behave like the
number 3 and like the multiplication operator, q.v. Church encoding.

Lambda calculus is known to be computationally equivalent in power to
many other plausible models for computation (including Turing machines); that is, any calculation that can be accomplished in any
of these other models can be expressed in lambda calculus, and
vice versa. According to the Church-Turing thesis, both models
can express any possible computation.

It is perhaps surprising that lambda-calculus can represent any
conceivable computation using only the simple notions of function
abstraction and application based on simple textual substitution of
terms for variables. But even more remarkable is that abstraction is
not even required. Combinatory logic is a model of computation
equivalent to lambda calculus, but without abstraction.  The advantage
of this is that evaluating expressions in lambda calculus is quite complicated
because the semantics of substitution must be specified with great care to
avoid variable capture problems.  In contrast, evaluating expressions in
combinatory logic is much simpler, because there is no notion of substitution.

Combinatory calculi 

Since abstraction is the only way to manufacture functions in the
lambda calculus, something must replace it in the combinatory
calculus.  Instead of abstraction, combinatory calculus provides a
limited set of primitive functions out of which other functions may be
built.

Combinatory terms 

A combinatory term has one of the following forms:

The primitive functions are combinators, or functions that, when seen as lambda terms, contain no free variables.

To shorten the notations, a general convention is that , or even , denotes the term . This is the same general convention (left-associativity) as for multiple application in lambda calculus.

Reduction in combinatory logic 

In combinatory logic, each primitive combinator comes with a reduction rule of the form

where E is a term mentioning only variables from the set . It is in this way that primitive combinators behave as functions.

Examples of combinators 

The simplest example of a combinator is I, the identity
combinator, defined by

(I x) = x

for all terms x.  Another simple combinator is K, which
manufactures constant functions:  (K x) is the function which,
for any argument, returns x, so we say

((K x) y) = x

for all terms x and y.  Or, following the convention for
multiple application,

(K x y) = x

A third combinator is S, which is a generalized version of
application:

(S x y z) = (x z (y z))

S applies x to y after first substituting z into
each of them. Or put another way, x is applied to y inside the
environment z.

Given S and K, I itself is unnecessary, since it can
be built from the other two:

((S K K) x)
  =  (S K K x)
  =  (K x (K x))
  =  x

for any term x.  Note that although ((S K K)
x) = (I x) for any x, (S K K)
itself is not equal to I.  We say the terms are extensionally equal.  Extensional equality captures the
mathematical notion of the equality of functions: that two functions
are equal if they always produce the same results for the same
arguments.  In contrast, the terms themselves, together with the
reduction of primitive combinators, capture the notion of
intensional equality of functions: that two functions are equal
only if they have identical implementations up to the expansion of primitive
combinators.  There are many ways to
implement an identity function; (S K K) and I
are among these ways.  (S K S) is yet another.  We
will use the word equivalent to indicate extensional equality,
reserving equal for identical combinatorial terms.

A more interesting combinator is the fixed point combinator or Y combinator, which can be used to implement recursion.

Completeness of the S-K basis 

S and K can be composed to produce combinators that are extensionally equal to any lambda term, and therefore, by Church's thesis, to any computable function whatsoever.  The proof is to present a transformation, T[ ], which converts an arbitrary lambda term into an equivalent combinator.

T[ ] may be defined as follows:

       T[x]          => x
       T[(E₁ E₂)]    => (T[E₁] T[E₂])
       T[λx.E]       => (K T[E])         (if x does not occur free in E)
       T[λx.x]       => I
       T[λx.λy.E]    => Tλx.Tλy.E (if x occurs free in E)
       T[λx.(E₁ E₂)] => (S T[λx.E₁] T[λx.E₂]) (if x occurs free in E₁ or E₂)

Note that T[ ] as given is not a well-typed mathematical function, but rather a term rewriter: Although it eventually yields a combinator, the transformation may generate intermediary expressions that are neither lambda terms nor combinators, via rule (5).

This process is also known as abstraction elimination. This definition is exhaustive: any lambda expression will be subject to exactly one of these rules (see Summary of lambda calculus above).

It is related to the process of bracket abstraction, which takes an expression E built from variables and application and produces a combinator expression [x]E in which the variable x is not free, such that [x]E x = E holds.
A very simple algorithm for bracket abstraction is defined by induction on the structure of expressions as follows:
 [x]y := K y
 [x]x := I
 [x](E₁ E₂) := S([x]E₁)([x]E₂)
Bracket abstraction induces a translation from lambda terms to combinator expressions, by interpreting lambda-abstractions using the bracket abstraction algorithm.

Conversion of a lambda term to an equivalent combinatorial term 

For example, we will convert the lambda term λx.λy.(y x) to a
combinatorial term:

T[λx.λy.(y x)]
        = Tλx.Tλy.(y x) (by 5)
        = T[λx.(S T[λy.y] T[λy.x])] (by 6)
        = T[λx.(S I       T[λy.x])] (by 4)
        = T[λx.(S I       (K T[x]))] (by 3)
        = T[λx.(S I       (K x))] (by 1)
        = (S T[λx.(S I)] T[λx.(K x)]) (by 6)
        = (S (K (S I))   T[λx.(K x)]) (by 3)
        = (S (K (S I))   (S T[λx.K] T[λx.x])) (by 6)
        = (S (K (S I))   (S (K K) T[λx.x])) (by 3)
        = (S (K (S I))   (S (K K) I)) (by 4)

If we apply this combinatorial term to any two terms x and y (by feeding them in a queue-like fashion into the combinator 'from the right'), it
reduces as follows:

          (S (K (S I)) (S (K K) I) x y)
        = (K (S I) x  (S (K K)   I x) y)
        = (S I (S (K K)   I x) y)
        = (I y (S (K K)   I x y))
        = (y (S (K K)   I x y))
        = (y (K K x (I x) y))
        = (y (K (I x) y))
        = (y (I x))
        = (y x)

The combinatory representation, (S (K (S I)) (S (K K) I)) is much
longer than the representation as a lambda term, λx.λy.(y x).  This is typical.  In general, the T[ ] construction may expand a lambda
term of length n to a combinatorial term of length
Θ(n3).

Explanation of the T[ ] transformation 

The T[ ] transformation is motivated by a desire to eliminate
abstraction.  Two special cases, rules 3 and 4, are trivial: λx.x is
clearly equivalent to I, and λx.E is clearly equivalent to
(K T[E]) if x does not appear free in E.

The first two rules are also simple: Variables convert to themselves,
and applications, which are allowed in combinatory terms, are
converted to combinators simply by converting the applicand and the
argument to combinators.

It is rules 5 and 6 that are of interest.  Rule 5 simply says that to convert a complex abstraction to a combinator, we must first convert its body to a combinator, and then eliminate the abstraction.  Rule 6 actually eliminates the abstraction.

λx.(E₁ E₂) is a function which takes an argument, say a, and
substitutes it into the lambda term (E₁ E₂) in place of x,
yielding (E₁ E₂)[x : = a].  But substituting a into (E₁ E₂) in place of x is just the same as substituting it into both E₁ and E₂, so

        (E₁ E₂)[x := a] = (E₁[x := a] E₂[x := a])

        (λx.(E₁ E₂) a) = ((λx.E₁ a) (λx.E₂ a))
                       = (S λx.E₁ λx.E₂ a)
                       = ((S λx.E₁ λx.E₂) a)

By extensional equality,

        λx.(E₁ E₂)     = (S λx.E₁ λx.E₂)

Therefore, to  find  a combinator equivalent to λx.(E₁ E₂), it is
sufficient to find a combinator equivalent to (S λx.E₁ λx.E₂), and

        (S T[λx.E₁] T[λx.E₂])

evidently fits the bill.  E₁ and E₂ each contain strictly fewer
applications than (E₁ E₂), so the recursion must terminate in a lambda
term with no applications at all—either a variable, or a term of the
form λx.E.

Simplifications of the transformation

η-reduction 

The combinators generated by the T[ ] transformation can be made
smaller if we take into account the η-reduction rule:

        T[λx.(E x)] = T[E]   (if x is not free in E)

λx.(E x) is the function which takes an argument, x, and
applies the function E to it; this is extensionally equal to the
function E itself.  It is therefore sufficient to convert E to
combinatorial form.

Taking this simplification into account, the example above becomes:

           T[λx.λy.(y x)]
        = ...
        = (S (K (S I))   T[λx.(K x)])
        = (S (K (S I))   K)                 (by η-reduction)

This combinator is equivalent to the earlier, longer one:

           (S (K (S I))   K x y)
        = (K (S I) x (K x) y)
        = (S I (K x) y)
        = (I y (K x y))
        = (y (K x y))
        = (y x)

Similarly, the original version of the T[ ] transformation
transformed the identity function λf.λx.(f x) into (S (S (K S) (S (K K) I)) (K I)).  With the η-reduction rule, λf.λx.(f x) is
transformed into I.

One-point basis 

There are one-point bases from which every combinator can be composed extensionally equal to any lambda term. The simplest example of such a basis is {X} where:

        X ≡ λx.((xS)K)

It is not difficult to verify that:
        X (X (X X)) =β K and
        X (X (X (X X))) =β S.

Since {K, S} is a basis, it follows that {X} is a basis too. The Iota programming language uses X as its sole combinator.

Another simple example of a one-point basis is:

        X' ≡ λx.(x K S K) with
        (X' X') X' =β K and
        X' (X' X') =β S

In fact, there exist infinitely many such bases.

Combinators B, C 

In addition to S and K, Schönfinkel's paper included two combinators which are now called B and C, with the following reductions:

        (C f g x) = ((f x) g)
        (B f g x) = (f (g x))

He also explains how they in turn can be expressed using only S and K:

 B = (S (K S) K) 
 C = (S (S (K (S (K S) K)) S) (K K))

These combinators are extremely useful when translating predicate logic or lambda calculus into combinator expressions. They were also used by Curry, and much later by David Turner, whose name has been associated with their computational use. Using them, we can extend the rules for the transformation as follows:

       T[x]          ⇒ x
       T[(E₁ E₂)]    ⇒ (T[E₁] T[E₂])
       T[λx.E]       ⇒ (K T[E])         (if x is not free in E)
       T[λx.x]       ⇒ I
       T[λx.λy.E]    ⇒ Tλx.Tλy.E (if x is free in E)
       T[λx.(E₁ E₂)] ⇒ (S T[λx.E₁] T[λx.E₂]) (if x is free in both E₁ and E₂)
       T[λx.(E₁ E₂)] ⇒ (C T[λx.E₁] T[E₂]) (if x is free in E₁ but not E₂)
       T[λx.(E₁ E₂)] ⇒ (B T[E₁] T[λx.E₂]) (if x is free in E₂ but not E₁)

Using B and C combinators, the transformation of
λx.λy.(y x) looks like this:

            T[λx.λy.(y x)]
        = Tλx.Tλy.(y x)
        = T[λx.(C T[λy.y] x)]     (by rule 7)
        = T[λx.(C I x)]
        = (C I)                   (η-reduction)
        =  (traditional canonical notation)
        = 

And indeed, (C I x y) does reduce to (y x):

            (C I x y)
        = (I y x)
        = (y x)

The motivation here is that B and C are limited versions of S.
Whereas S takes a value and substitutes it into both the applicand and
its argument before performing the application, C performs the
substitution only in the applicand, and B only in the argument.

The modern names for the combinators come from Haskell Curry's doctoral thesis of 1930 (see B, C, K, W System). In Schönfinkel's original paper, what we now call  S, K, I, B and C were called S, C, I, Z, and T respectively.

The reduction in combinator size that results from the new transformation rules
can also be achieved without introducing B and C, as demonstrated in Section 3.2 of.

CLK versus CLI calculus 
A distinction must be made between the CLK as described in this article and the CLI calculus. The distinction corresponds to that between the λK and the λI calculus. Unlike the λK calculus, the λI calculus restricts abstractions to:
λx.E where x has at least one free occurrence in E.
As a consequence, combinator K is not present in the λI calculus nor in the CLI calculus. The constants of CLI are: I, B, C and S, which form a basis from which all CLI terms can be composed (modulo equality). Every λI term can be converted into an equal CLI combinator according to rules similar to those presented above for the conversion of λK terms into CLK combinators. See chapter 9 in Barendregt (1984).

Reverse conversion 

The conversion L[ ] from combinatorial terms to lambda terms is
trivial:

 L[I]       = λx.x
 L[K]       = λx.λy.x
 L[C]       = λx.λy.λz.(x z y)
 L[B]       = λx.λy.λz.(x (y z))
 L[S]       = λx.λy.λz.(x z (y z))
 L[(E₁ E₂)] = (L[E₁] L[E₂])

Note, however, that this transformation is not the inverse
transformation of any of the versions of T[ ] that we have seen.

Undecidability of combinatorial calculus 

A normal form is any combinatory term in which the primitive combinators that occur, if any, are not applied to enough arguments to be simplified. It is undecidable whether a general combinatory term has a normal form; whether two combinatory terms are equivalent, etc.  This is equivalent to the undecidability of the corresponding problems for lambda terms.  However, a direct proof is as follows:

First, the term

        Ω = (S I I (S I I))

has no normal form, because it reduces to itself after three steps, as
follows:

  (S I I (S I I))
 = (I (S I I) (I (S I I)))
 = (S I I (I (S I I)))
 = (S I I (S I I))
and clearly no other reduction order can make the expression shorter.

Now, suppose N were a combinator for detecting normal forms,
such that

(Where  and  represent the conventional Church encodings of true and false, λx.λy.x and λx.λy.y, transformed into combinatory logic.

Now let

        Z = (C (C (B N (S I I)) Ω) I)

now consider the term  (S I I Z).  Does (S I I Z) have a normal
form?  It does if and only if the following do also:

 (S I I Z)
 = (I Z (I Z))
 = (Z (I Z))
 = (Z Z)
 = (C (C (B N (S I I)) Ω) I Z)           (definition of Z)
 = (C (B N (S I I)) Ω Z I)
 = (B N (S I I) Z Ω I)
 = (N (S I I Z) Ω I)
Now we need to apply N to (S I I Z).
Either (S I I Z) has a normal form, or it does not.  If it does
have a normal form, then the foregoing reduces as follows:

 (N (S I I Z) Ω I)
 = (K Ω I)                               (definition of N)
 = Ω
but Ω does not have a normal form, so we have a contradiction.  But
if (S I I Z) does not have a normal form, the foregoing reduces as
follows:

 (N (S I I Z) Ω I)
 = (K I Ω I)                             (definition of N)
 = (I I)
 = I
which means that the normal form of (S I I Z) is simply I, another
contradiction.  Therefore, the hypothetical normal-form combinator N
cannot exist.

The combinatory logic analogue of Rice's theorem says that there is no complete nontrivial predicate.  A predicate is a combinator that, when applied,  returns either T or F.   A predicate N is nontrivial if there are two arguments A and B such that N A = T and N B = F. A combinator N is complete if NM has a normal form for every argument M.  The analogue of Rice's theorem then says that every complete predicate is trivial. The proof of this theorem is rather simple.

From this undecidability theorem it immediately follows that there is no complete predicate that can discriminate between terms that have a normal form and terms that do not have a normal form. It also follows that there is no complete predicate, say EQUAL, such that:
(EQUAL A B) = T if A = B and
(EQUAL A B) = F if A ≠ B.
If EQUAL would exist, then for all A, λx.(EQUAL x A) would have to be a complete non trivial predicate.

Applications

Compilation of functional languages 

David Turner used his combinators to implement the SASL programming language.

Kenneth E. Iverson used primitives based on Curry's combinators in his J programming language, a successor to APL. This enabled what Iverson called tacit programming, that is, programming in functional expressions containing no variables, along with powerful tools for working with such programs. It turns out that tacit programming is possible in any APL-like language with user-defined operators.

Logic 
The Curry–Howard isomorphism implies a connection between logic and programming: every proof of a theorem of intuitionistic logic corresponds to a reduction of a typed lambda term, and conversely. Moreover, theorems can be identified with function type signatures. Specifically, a typed combinatory logic corresponds to a Hilbert system in proof theory.

The K and S combinators correspond to the axioms
AK: A → (B → A),
AS: (A → (B → C)) → ((A → B) → (A → C)),
and function application corresponds to the detachment (modus ponens) rule
MP: from A and A → B infer B.
The calculus consisting of AK, AS, and MP is complete for the implicational fragment of the intuitionistic logic, which can be seen as follows. Consider the set W of all deductively closed sets of formulas, ordered by inclusion. Then  is an intuitionistic Kripke frame, and we define a model  in this frame by

Let A be any formula which is not provable in the calculus. Then A does not belong to the deductive closure X of the empty set, thus , and A is not intuitionistically valid.

See also
 Applicative computing systems
 B, C, K, W system
 Categorical abstract machine
 Combinatory categorial grammar
 Explicit substitution
 Fixed point combinator
 Graph reduction machine
 Lambda calculus and Cylindric algebra, other approaches to modelling quantification and eliminating variables
 SKI combinator calculus
 Supercombinator
 To Mock a Mockingbird

References

Further reading
 
 
 
 
 
 
 
  Reprinted as Chapter 23 of Quine's Selected Logic Papers (1966), pp. 227–235
 Schönfinkel, Moses, 1924, "Über die Bausteine der mathematischen Logik," translated as "On the Building Blocks of Mathematical Logic" in From Frege to Gödel: a source book in mathematical logic, 1879–1931, Jean van Heijenoort, ed. Harvard University Press, 1967. . The article that founded combinatory logic.
 Smullyan, Raymond, 1985. To Mock a Mockingbird. Knopf. . A gentle introduction to combinatory logic, presented as a series of recreational puzzles using bird watching metaphors.
 __, 1994. Diagonalization and Self-Reference. Oxford University Press. Chapters 17–20 are a more formal introduction to combinatory logic, with a special emphasis on fixed point results.
 Sørensen, Morten Heine B. and Paweł Urzyczyn, 1999. Lectures on the Curry–Howard Isomorphism. University of Copenhagen and University of Warsaw, 1999.
 
  e. A celebration of the development of combinators, a hundred years after they were introduced by Moses Schönfinkel in 1920.

External links
Stanford Encyclopedia of Philosophy: "Combinatory Logic" by Katalin Bimbó.
1920–1931 Curry's block notes.
Keenan, David C. (2001) "To Dissect a Mockingbird: A Graphical Notation for the Lambda Calculus with Animated Reduction."
Rathman, Chris, "Combinator Birds." A table distilling much of the essence of Smullyan (1985).
Drag 'n' Drop Combinators. (Java Applet)
Binary Lambda Calculus and Combinatory Logic.
Combinatory logic reduction web server

Combinatory logic
Lambda calculus
Logic in computer science